Lasius emarginatus  is a species of boreal formicine ants.

Description
Lasius emarginatus is a small ant, reaching a length of  3–5.5 mm in the workers, 7–10 mm in the females and 7–14.5 mm in males. In workers and females the thorax is reddish or brownish-red, while the head and the abdomen are brown. Males are completely brown.

The longevity of the queen reaches up to 30 years, but for workers it is limited to 3 years. The species is omnivore. Colonies are monogynous (one queen per colony). They are not aggressive but they do not mind attacking a potential predator or another colony to expand their hunting and harvesting territory.

Distribution
This species is present in the Western Palearctic (Europe, the Caucasus, and Asia Minor). As an invasive species, it is now found in Manhattan where it has taken on the niche of above-ground-level floors in taller buildings.

Colony founding
The nuptial flight happens between June and August.
Although normal independent colony foundation is usual, it can also be achieved through Pleometrosis, a process in which several queens work together to get the colony started, but eventually the future workers will kill or drive away all queens but the dominant one.

References

 Olivier, 1792 : Encyclopédie Méthodique. Histoire Naturelle, ou Histoire Naturelle des Crustacés, des Arachnides et des Insectes]
 Fauna Europaea

External links

emarginatus
Insects described in 1792
Hymenoptera of Europe
Hymenoptera of Asia